Mihai Moldovanu (born 7 June 1965) is a Moldovan politician. Since May 2009 to 2010 he was member of Parliament of Moldova. From 14 January 2011 to 16 May 2013 he was Deputy Prime Minister of Moldova.

Biography
Mihai Moldovanu was born on 7 June 1965 in the village of Ordășei, in the region of Telenești of the Republic of Moldova. In 1984 he graduated from College of Medicine of Orhei. In 1992 he graduated from State University of Medicine and Pharmacheuticals «Nicolae Testemițanu» (Moldova).
 Since 1993 to 2007 he worked as in Hospital-Sanatorium of recovering of Government of Moldova
 Since 2007 to 2009 he was the director at Health Direction of Chișinău Municipal Consilium
 Since 2009 to 2010 he was deputy in Parliament of Moldova
 Since 2010 to 2011, he was again director at Health Direction of Chișinău Municipal Consilium
 From 14 January 2011 to 16 May 2013 he worked as Deputy Prime Minister of Moldova.

External links 
 
Mihai Moldovanu at Parliament of Moldova website

1965 births
Romanian people of Moldovan descent
Living people
People from Telenești District
Moldovan physicians
Liberal Party (Moldova) politicians
Moldovan MPs 2014–2018
Moldovan healthcare managers